Northfield may refer to:

Places

United Kingdom
 Northfield, Aberdeen, Scotland
 Northfield, Edinburgh, Scotland
 Northfield, Birmingham, England
 Northfield (Kettering BC Ward), Northamptonshire, England

United States 
 Northfield, Connecticut
 Northfield, Illinois
 Northfield, Indiana
 Northfield, Maine 
 Northfield, Massachusetts, a New England town
 Northfield (CDP), Massachusetts, a census-designated place in the town
 Northfield, Michigan, an unincorporated community
 Northfield, Minnesota
 Northfield, New Jersey
 Northfield, New Hampshire
 Northfield, Ohio
 Northfield, Vermont, town
 Northfield (CDP), Vermont, the main settled area in the town
 Northfield (village), Vermont, smaller village within the CDP; no longer incorporated
 Northfield, Wisconsin, town
 Northfield (community), Wisconsin, unincorporated community

Elsewhere 
 Northfield, South Australia
 Northfield Parish, New Brunswick, Canada
 Northfield, Nova Scotia (disambiguation), several places in Canada
 Northfield, Quebec, in the city of Gracefield, Canada

Education 
 Northfield Academy, secondary school in Aberdeen, Scotland
 Northfield Mount Hermon School, boarding school in Massachusetts towns of Northfield and Gill
 Northfield School & Sports College, comprehensive secondary school in Billingham, England
 Northfield School of the Liberal Arts, classical Christian school in Wichita, Kansas
 PAREF Northfield School, an all-boys private school in the Philippines

Companies
Northfield Laboratories

Other uses
 "Northfield", hymn by Jeremiah Ingalls

See also 
 Northfield Township (disambiguation)
 Northfields (disambiguation)